ZPL may refer to:
 ZPL (complexity), a complexity class
 ZPL (programming language), for scientific applications
 Zebra Programming Language, for label printers
 Zope Public License
 Lachixío Zapotec language (ISO 639-3 language code)